Tancos is a Portuguese freguesia ("civil parish"), located in the municipality of Vila Nova da Barquinha. The population in 2011 was 243, in an area of 2.04 km².

Tancos parish is the location of an important military area (Polígono de Tancos) that includes the Tancos Military Air Field, the Parachute Troops School and a military engineering unit.

Climate

References

Freguesias of Vila Nova da Barquinha